Dafachronic acids are steroid hormones activate the nuclear receptor Daf-12/NR1J1 in Caenorhabditis elegans and related organisms, include Δ4-dafachronic acid and Δ7-dafachronic acid. Both are generated by Daf-9/CYP22A1 from respective precursors.

References 

Steroid hormones